Melato is an Italian surname. Notable people with the surname include:

 Anna Melato (born 1952), Italian actress
 Maria Melato (1885–1950), Italian actress
 Mariangela Melato (1941–2013), Italian actress, sister of Anna

Italian-language surnames